In thermodynamics, the specific volume of a substance (symbol: , nu) is an intrinsic property of the substance, defined as the ratio of the substance's volume to its mass. It is the reciprocal of density  (rho) and it is related to the molar volume and molar mass:

The standard unit of specific volume is cubic meters per kilogram (m3/kg), but other units include ft3/lb, ft3/slug, or mL/g.

Specific volume for an ideal gas is related to the molar gas constant and the gas's temperature, pressure, and molar mass as shown:

Since  and

Applications
Specific volume is commonly applied to:
 Molar volume
 Volume (thermodynamics)
 Partial molar volume

Imagine a variable-volume, airtight chamber containing a certain number of atoms of oxygen gas. Consider the following four examples:
 If the chamber is made smaller without allowing gas in or out, the density increases and the specific volume decreases.
 If the chamber expands without letting gas in or out, the density decreases and the specific volume increases.
 If the size of the chamber remains constant and new atoms of gas are injected, the density increases and the specific volume decreases.
 If the size of the chamber remains constant and some atoms are removed, the density decreases and the specific volume increases.

Specific volume is a property of materials, defined as the number of cubic meters occupied by one kilogram of a particular substance. The standard unit is the meter cubed per kilogram (m3/kg or m3·kg−1).

Sometimes specific volume is expressed in terms of the number of cubic centimeters occupied by one gram of a substance. In this case, the unit is the centimeter cubed per gram (cm3/g or cm3·g−1). To convert m3/kg to cm3/g, multiply by 1000; conversely, multiply by 0.001.

Specific volume is inversely proportional to density. If the density of a substance doubles, its specific volume, as expressed in the same base units, is cut in half. If the density drops to 1/10 its former value, the specific volume, as expressed in the same base units, increases by a factor of 10.

The density of gases changes with even slight variations in temperature, while densities of liquid and solids, which are generally thought of as incompressible, will change very little. Specific volume is the inverse of the density of a substance; therefore, careful consideration must be taken account when dealing with situations that involve gases. Small changes in temperature will have a noticeable effect on specific volumes.

The average density of human blood is 1060 kg/m3. The specific volume that correlates to that density is 0.00094 m3/kg. Notice that the average specific volume of blood is almost identical to that of water: 0.00100 m3/kg.

Application examples

In that case, the specific volume would equal 0.4672 in3/lb.

Knowing the specific volumes of two or more substances allows one to find useful information for certain applications. For a substance X with a specific volume of 0.657 cm3/g and a substance Y with a specific volume 0.374 cm3/g, the density of each substance can be found by taking the inverse of the specific volume; therefore, substance X has a density of 1.522 g/cm3 and substance Y has a density of 2.673 g/cm3. With this information, the specific gravities of each substance relative to one another can be found. The specific gravity of substance X with respect to Y is 0.569, while the specific gravity of Y with respect to X is 1.756. Therefore, substance X will not sink if placed on Y.

Specific volume of solutions
The specific volume of a non-ideal solution is the sum of the partial specific volumes of the components:

M is the molar mass of the mixture.

Table of common specific volumes
The table below displays densities and specific volumes for various common substances that may be useful. The values were recorded at standard temperature and pressure, which is defined as air at 0 °C (273.15 K, 32 °F) and 1 atm (101.325 kN/m2, 101.325 kPa, 14.7 psia, 0 psig, 30 in Hg, 760 torr).

* values not taken at standard temperature and pressure

References

Thermodynamic properties